HMS Duke was a 98-gun second rate ship of the line of the Royal Navy, launched on 18 October 1777 at Plymouth.

She was named after the Duke of Cumberland of Culloden fame and had a figurehead of the Duke.

She was at the Battle of Ushant in July 1778 and the Battle of the Saintes''' (known to the French as the Bataille de la Dominique), or Battle of Dominica, that took place 9 April 1782 – 12 April 1782, during the American Revolutionary War. Under command of Captain Alan Gardner (later Baron Gardner) she served in the white squadron under overall control of Admiral George Rodney.Duke was employed on harbour service from 1799, and was broken up in 1843.

Citations and notes

References

Lavery, Brian (2003) The Ship of the Line - Volume 1: The development of the battlefleet 1650–1850.'' Conway Maritime Press. .

Ships of the line of the Royal Navy
Duke-class ships of the line
1777 ships